Transport in Liberia consist of 266 mi of railways, 6,580 mi of highways (408 mi paved), seaports, 29 airports (2 paved) and 2 mi of pipeline for oil transportation.  Busses and taxis are the main forms of ground transportation in and around Monrovia. Charter boats are also available.

Railways 

Historically, three railways were built in Liberia to export ore from mines; they were damaged during civil war. In 2010, only the Bong mine railway was operational but the Lamco Railway was at least partially rebuilt by ArcelorMittal and put back into service in 2011. There are no rail connections with other countries, although there has been a proposal to extend the Bong mine railway to serve a mine across the border in Guinea.

Total:
429 km (2008)

Standard gauge:
345km (2008)

Narrow gauge:
84 km (2008)

Roadways 

Total:
10,600 km (6,586 mi) (there is major deterioration on all highways due to heavy rains and lack of maintenance)

Paved:
657 km (408 mi)

Unpaved:
9,943 km (6,178 mi) (2018)

When construction and reconstruction of roads in Liberia is complete, the Trans–West African Coastal Highway will cross the country, connecting it to Freetown (Sierra Leone), Abidjan (Ivory Coast), and eventually to 11 other nations of the Economic Community of West African States (ECOWAS).

Ports and harbors 
 Greenville
 Harper
 Monrovia

Merchant marine 
Liberia is an international flag of convenience for freight shipping.

Total:
3,942 (2021) 

Ships by type:
barge carrier 1,487, container ship 878, general cargo 131, oil tanker 851, other 595 (2021)

Airports 

20 (2017)
The main international airport in the country is Roberts International Airport.

Airports - with paved runways 
Total:
2
Over 3,047 m (10,000 ft):
1
1,524 to 2,437 m (5,000 to 8,000 ft):
1 (2017)

Airports - with unpaved runways 
Total:
27
1,524 to 2,437 m (5,000 to 8,000 ft):
5
914 to 1,523 m (3,000 to 4,999 ft):
8
Under 914 m (3,000 ft):
14 (2013)

See also 
 Economy of Liberia

References

External links